Steven Douglas Brown (born March 20, 1960) is a former American football cornerback and coach who is the defensive coordinator and defensive backs coach for the Michigan Panthers of the United States Football League (USFL). Brown played his entire pro football career with the Houston Oilers from 1983 to 1990. He played college football at Oregon.

Early life
Born and raised in Sacramento, California, Brown graduated from C. K. McClatchy High School in 1978.

College career
Brown played defensive back and kick returner for four seasons on the University of Oregon Ducks football team from 1979 to 1982 under coach Rich Brooks. Brown graduated in 1983 with a degree in English literature and was a member of Kappa Alpha Psi. Brown returned 78 kickoffs for 1,868 yards and a touchdown and 18 punts for 185 yards and a touchdown. He also had 8 interceptions returned for 139 yards and a touchdown.

Professional playing career
From 1983 to 1990, Brown played at left cornerback for the Houston Oilers. He had 18 interceptions returned for 264 yards and a touchdown and also had 5 sacks. Brown was also a kick returner from 1983 to 1985, with 36 returns for 857 yards and a touchdown.

NFL career statistics

Coaching career

St. Louis Rams
In 1995, Brown reunited with Rich Brooks, his former coach at Oregon, to become a defensive assistant coach for the St. Louis Rams  under Brooks. Brown moved to coaching cornerbacks in 1996 and remained cornerbacks coach in 1997 under new coach Dick Vermeil. From 1998 to 2000, including the 1999 Super Bowl XXXIV championship season, Brown coached the defensive backs at St. Louis. Brown coached under Mike Martz in the 2000 season. Among Rams players coached by Brown include Dre' Bly, Kevin Carter, London Fletcher, and  Todd Lyght.

Kentucky
In 2003, Brown joined Rich Brooks's staff at the University of Kentucky as defensive backs coach. Brown remained in that position until 2006 and was promoted to defensive coordinator in 2007. Brown remained defensive coordinator in Joker Phillips's inaugural 2010 staff and became co-defensive coordinator and defensive backs coach in 2011. Brown coached in Kentucky teams with three straight bowl wins (2006 Music City Bowl, 2007 Music City Bowl, and 2009 Liberty Bowl) as well as two runner-up bowl appearances (2009 Music City Bowl, 2011 BBVA Compass Bowl).

Tennessee Titans
In 2012, Brown joined Mike Munchak's staff at the Tennessee Titans as assistant secondary coach; he remained at this position under new coach Ken Whisenhunt in 2014. After the 2015 season, Brown left the Tennessee Titans.

East Tennessee State
He returned to coaching in 2018, accepting the position of defensive backs coach at ETSU.

Michigan Panthers
On February 7, 2023, Brown was hired as the defensive coordinator and defensive backs coach for the Michigan Panthers of the  United States Football League (USFL).

Personal life
Brown is the older brother of actress Olivia Brown, who co-starred in the 1980s hit show Miami Vice.

References

External links
NFL.com player page

1960 births
Living people
African-American coaches of American football
African-American players of American football
American football cornerbacks
Houston Oilers players
Kentucky Wildcats football coaches
Oregon Ducks football players
Players of American football from Sacramento, California
St. Louis Rams coaches
Tennessee Titans coaches
21st-century African-American people
20th-century African-American sportspeople
Michigan Panthers (2022) coaches